Han Ji-hye (born Lee Ji-hye on June 29, 1984) is a South Korean actress.

Background 
Born Lee Ji-hye, she used the stage name "Han Ji-hye" upon learning that her real name would cause confusion among fans since an older actress, Lena Lee, also has the same Korean name.

Career

2001–2007 
Han made her entertainment debut as a model, then started acting in supporting roles in TV dramas such as Summer Scent. She landed her first leading role in Sweet 18. The next couple of years saw Han starring in low-rating dramas, but her 2007 daily drama Likeable or Not became very popular, topping the ratings chart during its run and recording the highest rating for a daily drama since 2000. Han then displayed newfound maturity and great improvement in her acting in the 2008 epic drama East of Eden.

2008–2011 
In 2008, Han along with Leon Jay Williams sang the Korean and Chinese versions of Olympic theme song "Friends." She was brought to the project via a proposal from the Chinese Olympic committee to sing "Friends" as the official swimming theme of the Beijing National Aquatics Centre at the Beijing Olympics.  Less than a year later, she again recorded a digital single, an upbeat electro-pop song titled "Luv Luv".

After studying the craft of shoemaking and design in Florence, Italy, Han collaborated with existing shoe brand Jinny Kim to design and produce her own line, called "H by Jinny Kim." This was documented on Han Ji-hye: Shoes! My Dream! which aired on cable channel O'live TV. The Fall/Winter 2009 collection were sold in major department stores in Seoul and the surrounding metro areas, as well as in a well-known department store in Singapore and various online shopping malls.

Han then published My Fair Lady, a collection of autobiographical lifestyle essays. The volume focused on Han's hobbies and daily life rather than on her onscreen work and contained Han's writings about her experiences as a twentysomething single woman, as well as her reflections on her life. It also touched on the various projects she has undertaken such as designing shoes, studying tea ceremony, learning about ceramics, DIY furniture making, and fabric art.

Director Lee Joon-ik cast Han in his 2010 period action film Blades of Blood without auditioning her — not for her talents, but for her Asian-looking eyes. Aside from finding her single eyelid unique and difficult to find in recent years, Lee liked that she related to him in a natural manner. Han said that Lee scolded her a lot in the beginning of the shoot for not acting well, so she used the pain in her heart to portray her character such that she improved towards the middle of the filming and learned a lot from him. She also sang on the soundtrack, having played a gisaeng in the film.

After starring in her first period drama series in 2011's The Duo, she played a woman who helps a young man achieve his dreams in the single-episode drama Pianist, and a visually impaired teacher in the 2-part Chuseok special The Great Gift. She also starred in her first Chinese drama, Heavenly Embroidery.

2012–present 
Han played the protagonist in the 2012 drama May Queen, the success story of a woman in the shipbuilding industry during Korea's modernization. In 2013, she portrayed dual roles in Pots of Gold (also known as I Summon You, Gold! or Gold, Appear!), a family comedy that explores money, love and marriage.
This was followed by leading roles as a cold-hearted heiress in The Full Sun, and as a wrongfully convicted prisoner turned baker in 4 Legendary Witches in 2014.

In January 2016, Han signed with management agency KeyEast. In 2018, she made a comeback in the family drama Shall We Live Together.

Personal life 
On September 21, 2010, Han married public prosecutor Jung Hyuk-joon in a private ceremony in Hawaii. On the December 31, 2020, Han announced on social media that she is expecting a child, due in Summer 2021. On June 23, 2021, Han's agency announced that had given birth to a daughter Jung Yoon-seul. Both her husband and daughter appeared on public television for the first time via Stars' Top Recipe at Fun-Staurant.

Filmography

Film

Television series

Music video

Discography

Book

Shoe line

Awards and nominations

References

External links 
Han Ji-hye  at Content Y

 

South Korean film actresses
South Korean television actresses
South Korean female models
Sejong University alumni
People from Gwangju
1984 births
Living people